Jorge Oscar Racca (born September 4, 1971 in General Pico, La Pampa, Argentina) is an Argentine-Italian retired male professional basketball player. At 6'6" (1.98 m) and 218 lbs. (99 kg), he played at the shooting guard and small forward positions. Nicknamed "Pampa" during his career, Racca was a member of Argentina's national basketball team at the 1996 Summer Olympics.

Professional career
Racca was named the MVP of the Argentine League Finals in 1996, and the season's league MVP of the Argentine League in 1996, and 1997, while he was playing with Olimpia de Venado Tuerto. In his most productive season, with Canarias Telecom in the Spanish professional league Liga ACB, Racca averaged 17.4 points per game over 32 games in 1999-2000. Racca holds the Argentine national league record in field goals per game, with 23.24 (7,227 in 311 games). He was also named the MVP of the FIBA South American League in 1996.

National team career
Racca played with the senior men's Argentine national basketball team at the 1994 FIBA World Championship. He won a gold medal with Argentina at the 1995 Pan American Games. 

He also played with Argentina at the 1996 Summer Olympic Games in Atlanta, Georgia, where Argentina finished in ninth place in the overall standings. Racca wore uniform number 9. 

At the Summer Games in 1996, Argentina competed in seven games, finishing with a record of 3-4. 

In a loss to the United States (The Dream Team) 96-68, Racca tallied 6 points, 3 rebounds, and 2 assists. In six games at the Olympics, Racca averaged 7.2 points, 3 rebounds, and 2 assists in 21.3 minutes per game.

References

External links

FIBA Profile
Euroleague.net Profile
LatinBasket.com Profile
Spanish League Profile 

1971 births
Living people
Argentine expatriate basketball people in Spain
Argentine men's basketball players
Basketball players at the 1995 Pan American Games
Basketball players at the 1996 Summer Olympics
Boca Juniors basketball players
CB Breogán players
CB Gran Canaria players
Italian expatriate basketball people in Spain
Italian men's basketball players
Liga ACB players
Olimpia de Venado Tuerto basketball players
Olympic basketball players of Argentina
Pan American Games gold medalists for Argentina
Pan American Games medalists in basketball
P.A.O.K. BC players
Quilmes de Mar del Plata basketball players
People from General Pico
Shooting guards
Small forwards
Tenerife CB players
Viola Reggio Calabria players
Medalists at the 1995 Pan American Games
1994 FIBA World Championship players